Zmeinogorsky District is an administrative and municipal district (raion), one of the fifty-nine in Altai Krai, Russia. It is located in the south of the krai. Its administrative center is the town of Zmeinogorsk. Population:  The population of Zmeinogorsk accounts for 52.1% of the district's total population.

Economy
The district is home to the Korbalikhinskoye mine, which has one of the largest reserves of Lead in Russia.

References

Notes

Sources

Districts of Altai Krai